

Pool A

The following is the Belgian roster in the 2016 Montreux Volley Masters.

Head coach: Gert Vande Broek

The following is the Brazilian roster in the 2016 Montreux Volley Masters.

Head coach: Wagner Luiz Coppini Fernandes

The following is the Chinese roster in the 2016 Montreux Volley Masters.

Head coach:

The following is the Turkish roster in the 2016 Montreux Volley Masters.

Head coach: Ferhat Akbas

Pool B

The following is the Thai roster in the 2016 Montreux Volley Masters.

The following is the Thai roster in the 2016 Montreux Volley Masters.

Head Coach: Terzic Zoran

The following is the Thai roster in the 2016 Montreux Volley Masters.

The following is the Thai roster in the 2016 Montreux Volley Masters.

Head Coach: Danai Sriwatcharamethakul

References

2016
Montreux Volley Masters
Montreux Volley Masters